The Brookdale Handicap was an American Thoroughbred horse race run annually in mid summer from 1887 through 1910 at Gravesend Race Track in Brooklyn, New York and from 1914 through 1933 at  Aqueduct Racetrack in Queens. Open to horses age three and older, it was contested on dirt over a distance of one mile, one furlong.

Gravesend Race Track opened on August 26, 1886 and the first Brookdale Handicap would be run during the following Spring/Summer racing season. On May 26, 1887, the inaugural running of the Brookdale Handicap was won by future Hall of Fame inductee, Hanover, ridden by Jim McLaughlin and trained by Frank McCabe both of whom would also be inducted in racing's Hall of Fame.

There was no race held for the three years between 1911 and 1913  as a result of the passage by the New York Legislature of the Republican Party's Hart–Agnew Law. Following a Court ruling, racing resumed in New York State but by then the financial problems arising from the law's effects resulted in the Gravsend track having gone out of business. The Brookdale Handicap was revived in 1914 by the Queens County Jockey Club at its Aqueduct Racetrack.

In 1933, the race was run at one mile. This was the last of the races ran for this course.

Records
Speed record:
 1:48.80 – Peanuts (1927)

Most wins:
 2 – Go Between (1905, 1906)

Winners of the Brookdale Handicap

1933 – Flagstone
1932 – Blenheim III
1931 – Sidney Grant
1930 – Jack High
1929 – Diavolo
1928 – Victorian
1927 – Peanuts
1926 – Macaw
1925 – Whetstone
1924 – Mad Play
1923 – Flagstaff
1922 – Captain Alcock
1921 – Yellow Hand
1920 – Exterminator
1919 – Trompe La Mort
1918 – Hand Grenade
1917 – Boots
1916 – Short Grass
1915 – Roamer
1914 – Flying Fairy
1913 – no race
1912 – no race
1911 – no race
1910 – Fashion Plate
1909 – Joe Madden
1908 – Gretna Green
1907 – Zambesi
1906 – Go Between
1905 – Go Between
1904 – Hermis
1903 – Hunter Raine
1902 – Morningside
1901 – Carbuncle
1900 – Jean Bereaud
1899 – Don De Oro
1898 – Royal Stag
1897 – Lehman
1896 – St. Maxim
1895 – Stephen J
1894 – Don Alonzo
1893 – Charade
1892 – Major Domo
1891 – Eon
1890 – Grey Dawn
1889 – Inspector B
1888 – Richmond
1887 – Hanover

References

Discontinued horse races in New York City
Recurring sporting events established in 1887
Gravesend Race Track
Aqueduct Racetrack
Recurring events disestablished in 1933
1887 establishments in New York (state)
1933 disestablishments in New York (state)